Cartago Station is a railway station, managed by Incofer, located in Occidental district, in the Cartago canton of the Cartago province.

Adjacent stations
To the north of the station is the bus stop to San José, managed by LUMACA.

References

Rail transport in Costa Rica